The Malmstrom Museum is an aviation museum located at Malmstrom Air Force Base near Great Falls, Montana.

History 
The museum was dedicated on 3 July 1982, at the time being housed in two trailers previously used as classrooms on the base. In 1989 it received a P-63 restoration project from the New England Air Museum. The museum closed for renovations in 1996 and reopened two and a half years later in a larger building.

Exhibits 

Displays at the museum include a launch control center from a ballistic missile silo, a mockup of a World War II barracks, a model airplane collection, an AIR-2 missile, and a core memory element of a FSQ-7 computer.

On display outside are a totem pole, a LGM-30G missile, a missile transport vehicle, an MPS-9 radar trailer, a Dodge Power Wagon ambulance, a Peacekeeper armored vehicle, and a 1947 Ford.

Collection 

 Bell UH-1F Iroquois
 Boeing KC-97G Stratofreighter
 Lockheed T-33
 Martin B-57B Canberra
 McDonnell F-101F Voodoo
 North American TB-25M Mitchell
 Republic F-84F Thunderstreak

See also 
 McChord Air Museum

References

External links 
 Official website (Archived)

1982 establishments in Montana
Aerospace museums in Montana
Military and war museums in the United States
Museums in Cascade County, Montana
Museums established in 1982